Luis Ernesto González Vales (born May 11, 1930, in Río Piedras, Puerto Rico) is the latest of many historians who have held the post of Official Historian of Puerto Rico, having succeeded Pilar Barbosa in the post.

Education
Graduate of Bachelor of Arts with a concentration in history from the University of Puerto Rico, Dr. González Vales obtained his master's degree from the Columbia University of New York, where he also carried out doctoral courses. He was Professor of history of the University of Puerto Rico and Associate Dean of the Faculty of General Studies of the Rio Piedras campus from the University of Puerto Rico. He held the position of Executive Secretary of the Board of higher education, and he was appointed by the Legislative Assembly of Puerto Rico and the Governor as official historian of Puerto Rico.

Military career
González Vale, a military historian, started his military career on May 31, 1952, as a second lieutenant in the United States Army Reserve thru the Army ROTC program, on March 10, 1952, went to active duty in the United States Army with the 296 regiment and later on to Germany assigned to the 12th Infantry Regiment, 4th Infantry Division. Joined the Puerto Rico National Guard in 1955 and became a platoon leader in the 295th Infantry Regiment. Served as liaison officer and platoon leader with the 1st battalion 101st Cavalry Regiment in the New York National Guard in 1963. Returned to the Puerto Rico National Guard in September 1964 assigned to the 65th Infantry Regiment, 1st Battalion in Cayey, Puerto Rico. Served from 1971 to 1979 in the United States Army Reserve to command a unit of the Industrial College of the Armed Forces at Fort Buchanan, Puerto Rico. Returned to the Puerto Rico National Guard in 1979 and became Assistant Adjutant General. Graduated at the United States Army Command and General Staff College. In 1983 appointed Adjutant General of the Puerto Rico National Guard by governor Carlos Romero Barceló. As Adjutant General, González Vale bade farewell to Pope John Paul II as he departed Muñiz Air National Guard Base, Puerto Rico on October 12, 1984. Along with Cardinal Luis Aponte Martínez, he was the keynote speaker at a Puerto Rico Department of State exhibition in March–April 2009 of memorabilia of the Pope's visit to Puerto Rico.

As a professor at the University of Puerto Rico, where he also held administrative posts in the 1990s.

He hosted a major international convention of historians in April, 2008 in San Juan, Puerto Rico.

He chaired the Quincentennial of the Governorship of Puerto Rico Committee which restored the Juan Ponce de León monument in Old San Juan, held an event on January 21, 2011, at Santervás del Campo, Spain, the birthplace of Puerto Rico's first Governor, where a similar monument was unveiled, and organized several other academic events to commemorate the institution of the Governorship of Puerto Rico.

Awards and decorations
Among BG Luis González Vales military decorations were the following:

Promotions

References

External links
 Oficina de Servicios Legislativos de Puerto Rico official site

1930 births
Living people
Columbia University alumni
United States Army generals
National Guard (United States) generals
New York National Guard personnel
Military historians
People from Río Piedras, Puerto Rico
20th-century Puerto Rican historians
Puerto Rican Army personnel
Puerto Rico Adjutant Generals
University of Puerto Rico alumni
University of Puerto Rico faculty
United States Army Command and General Staff College alumni
United States Army reservists
Puerto Rico National Guard personnel
Puerto Rican military officers
Historians of Puerto Rico
21st-century Puerto Rican historians